Rodriquez Pond is a freshwater frozen pond in the Labyrinth of Wright Valley in the McMurdo Dry Valleys. The pond is the larger of the two ponds that lie west of Hoffman Ledge in Healy Trough. It is just southeast of smaller Redman Pond. Named by Advisory Committee on Antarctic Names (US-ACAN) after Russell Rodriquez, U.S. Geological Survey, Seattle, WA; member of a United States Antarctic Program (USAP) party that sampled the pond in 2003–04.
 

Lakes of Victoria Land
McMurdo Dry Valleys